Spiralizoros is a genus of zorapterans in the family Spiralizoridae. There are about eight described species in Spiralizoros. The species of this genus were transferred from the genus Zorotypus as a result of research published in 2020.

Species
These species belong to the genus Spiralizoros:
 Spiralizoros buxtoni (Karny, 1932)
 Spiralizoros caudelli (Karny, 1923)
 Spiralizoros cervicornis (Mashimo, Yoshizawa & Engel, 2013)
 Spiralizoros ceylonicus (Silvestri, 1913)
 Spiralizoros hainanensis (Yin & Li, 2015)
 Spiralizoros magnicaudelli (Mashimo, Engel, Dallai, Beutel & Machida, 2013)
 Spiralizoros philippinensis (Gurney, 1938)
 Spiralizoros silvestrii (Karny, 1927)

References

Zoraptera
Insect genera